
Gmina Parzęczew is a rural gmina (administrative district) in Zgierz County, Łódź Voivodeship, in central Poland.

Villages
Gmina Parzęczew contains the villages and settlements of Anastazew, Bibianów, Chociszew, Chrząstów Wielki, Chrząstówek, Duraj, Florentynów, Florianki, Gołaszyny, Ignacew Folwarczny, Ignacew Parzęczewski, Ignacew Podleśny, Ignacew Rozlazły, Janów, Julianki, Konstantki, Kowalewice, Kozikówka, Leźnica Wielka, Leźnica Wielka-Osiedle, Mamień, Mariampol, Mikołajew, Mrożewice, Nowa Jerozolima, Nowe Młyny, Opole, Orła, Parzęczew, Piaskowice, Pustkowa Góra, Radzibórz, Różyce, Różyce Żmijowe, Skórka, Śliwniki, Śniatowa, Sokola Góra, Stary Chrząstów, Sulimy, Tkaczewska Góra, Trojany, Wielka Wieś, Wytrzyszczki and Zelgoszcz.

Neighbouring gminas
Gmina Parzęczew is bordered by the town of Ozorków and by the gminas of Aleksandrów Łódzki, Dalików, Łęczyca, Ozorków, Wartkowice and Zgierz.

References
Polish official population figures 2006

Parzeczew
Zgierz County